The Victory Medal is the Belgian variant of the Inter-Allied Victory Medal 1914–1918 was a Belgian commemorative war medal established by royal decree on 15 July 1919 and awarded to all members of the Belgian Armed Forces who served during the First World War.  Later royal decrees enlarged the list of potential recipients to include service in African campaigns and under special circumstances, to members of the merchant navy and fishing fleet. In all, 350,000 were awarded.

The Belgian sculptor Paul Du Bois was responsible for the design.

It is worn immediately after the Yser Medal (or Yser Cross) in the Belgian order of precedence.

Award description
The Belgian Inter-Allied Victory Medal 1914–1918 was a 36mm in diameter circular gilt bronze medal.  Its obverse bore a winged victory standing on a globe, her arms and wings spread out, looking down at Earth.  The reverse bore, superimposed over a laurel wreath, the coats of arms of the Allies, starting at center top and going clockwise, French Third Republic, United States, Empire of Japan, Kingdom of Greece, Brazil, Serbia, Portugal, Kingdom of Italy, United Kingdom, and at center, the Royal Coat of Arms of Belgium.  Along the outer circumference, the relief bilingual inscription in French and Dutch "THE GREAT WAR FOR CIVILISATION".

The medal was suspended by a ring through a suspension loop from a 38mm wide silk moiré rainbow coloured ribbon common to the Inter-Allied Victory Medals 1914–1918 of all of the First World War Allies.

Notable recipients (partial list)
The individuals listed below were awarded the Belgian Inter-Allied Victory Medal:
Lieutenant General Alphonse Ferdinand Tromme
Cavalry Lieutenant General Marcel Jooris
Major General Maurice Jacmart
Lieutenant General Jean-Baptiste Piron
Lieutenant General Jules Joseph Pire
Cavalry Lieutenant General Sir Maximilien de Neve de Roden
Cavalry Lieutenant General Baron Victor Van Strijdonck de Burkel
Lieutenant General Georges Deffontaine
Lieutenant General Alphonse Verstraete
Lieutenant General Baron Raoul de Hennin de Boussu-Walcourt
Lieutenant General Joseph Leroy
Cavalry Lieutenant General Jules De Boeck
Lieutenant General Fernand Vanderhaeghen
Lieutenant General Robert Oor
Lieutenant General Libert Elie Thomas
Lieutenant General Léon Bievez
Cavalry Major General Baron Beaudoin de Maere d’Aertrycke
Major General Lucien Van Hoof
Major General Jean Buysse
Major General Paul Jacques
Commodore Georges Timmermans
Aviator Major General Norbert Leboutte
Police Lieutenant General Louis Joseph Leroy
Police Lieutenant General Oscar-Eugène Dethise
Chaplain General Louis Kerremans
Lieutenant General Harry Jungbluth
Cavalry Lieutenant General Baron Albert du Roy de Blicquy
Lieutenant General Sir Antonin de Selliers de Moranville
Lieutenant General Baron Louis de Ryckel
Lieutenant General Baron Émile Dossin de Saint-Georges
Lieutenant General Baron Honoré Drubbel
Lieutenant General Count Gérard-Mathieu Leman
Lieutenant General Victor Bertrand
Lieutenant General Baron Jules Jacques de Dixmude
Lieutenant General Georges Guiette
Lieutenant General Albert Lantonnois van Rode
Lieutenant General Baron Armand de Ceuninck
Lieutenant General Aloïs Biebuyck
Cavalry Lieutenant General Baron Léon de Witte de Haelen
Cavalry Lieutenant General Vicount Victor Buffin de Chosal
Cavalry Lieutenant General Jules De Blauwe
Major General Doctor Antoine Depage
Major General Baron Edouard Empain
Plk. gst. Jaroslav Hajicek (Czechoslovakia)

See also

 List of Orders, Decorations and Medals of the Kingdom of Belgium

References

Other sources
 Quinot H., 1950, Recueil illustré des décorations belges et congolaises, 4e Edition. (Hasselt)
 Cornet R., 1982, Recueil des dispositions légales et réglementaires régissant les ordres nationaux belges. 2e Ed. N.pl.,  (Brussels)
 Borné A.C., 1985, Distinctions honorifiques de la Belgique, 1830-1985 (Brussels)

External links
Bibliothèque royale de Belgique (In French)
Les Ordres Nationaux Belges (In French)
ARS MORIENDI Notables from Belgian history (In French and Dutch)

Armed Resistance 1940-1945, Medal of the
Military awards and decorations of Belgium
Awards established in 1919
Interallied Victory Medals of World War I
1919 establishments in Belgium